Daniel Acon (born January 24, 1958 Rome) is an American Special Effects Coordinator and Supervisor.

He graduated from Seton Hall University.
He has created the special effects for many blockbuster movies and primetime TV shows. 
Daniel Acon has been nominated for 2 primetime Emmy awards, 2002 and 2007 for Art Directing Sting's television concert "Sting ...All this time", and for the special effects on HBO's Rome television series. Has also gotten a Royal Television Society nomination for the television series Rome.

He has worked with film directors such as Martin Scorsese on Gangs of New York, Mel Gibson on The Passion of Christ, J.J. Abrams, on Mission: Impossible III, Ridley Scott's Hannibal, and recently with director Spike Lee on Miracle at St. Anna.

His current special effects filmography is issued on IMDb and consists of the following motion pictures and television movies and series:
 Angels and Demons directed by Ron Howard
 Miracle at St. Anna by Spike Lee
 Jumper
 Mission: Impossible III
 The Life Aquatic with Steve Zissou
 Eros
 The Passion of the Christ
 The Order
 Gangs of New York
 Hannibal
 Malèna
 U-571
 A Midsummer Night's Dream
 Legionnaire
 Double Team
 Daylight
 Cliffhanger
 The Godfather Part III
 Rome (TV)
 Ghostboat Judas My House in Umbria and Samson and Delilah'' (TV movie)

References

1958 births
Living people
Special effects coordinators
Italian emigrants to the United States
Seton Hall University alumni